Blaize is a given name. Notable people with the name include:

Blaize Clement (1932–2011), American writer
Gilbert Blaize Rego (1921–2012), Indian Roman Catholic bishop

See also
 Blaise (disambiguation)
 Blaise (name)